Jacques-Louis Villeneuve (1 January 1865 – 16 February 1933) was a French sculptor. His work was part of the sculpture event in the art competition at the 1928 Summer Olympics.

References

1865 births
1933 deaths
20th-century French sculptors
French male sculptors
Olympic competitors in art competitions
People from Hérault